Cyanophrys amyntor, the Amyntor greenstreak, is a butterfly in the family Lycaenidae. It is found in the lowland tropics from Mexico to Brazil. It is known in the United States from a single specimen from the Big Bend region of western Texas. It has also been recorded from Hawaii.

The wingspan is 24–28 mm. Adults are on wing from July to January in Mexico.

The larvae feed on a wide range of plants, including species from the families Ulmaceae and Verbenaceae.

External links
Nearctica

amyntor
Butterflies of North America
Lycaenidae of South America
Insects of Hawaii
Butterflies described in 1775
Taxa named by Pieter Cramer